Shekou is an area in Shenzhen, China.

Shekou may also refer to:

 Shekou, Fu'an (社口镇), town in Fujian, China